Fourth Ward Historic District may refer to:
Fourth Ward Historic District (Greenwich, Connecticut)
Fourth Ward Historic District (Albuquerque, New Mexico)
Old Fourth Ward Southeast Historic District in Waverly, Iowa